Connor Patrick O'Riordan (born 19 October 2003) is an Irish professional footballer who plays as a defender for League Two club Crewe Alexandra.

Career
O'Riordan signed a scholarship deal with Crewe Alexandra's Academy in 2020.

In September 2021, he joined Kidsgrove Athletic on a month-long loan before having a similar spell at Nantwich Town the following month.

Upon returning to Crewe, he made his Crewe debut on 1 December 2021, being named in the starting line-up for an EFL Trophy knock-out game against Doncaster Rovers at Gresty Road. Still an Academy scholar, he made his first league start on 29 January 2022 at Gresty Road against Rotherham United. He signed his first professional deal with the club at the end of the 2021–22 season.

On 5 August 2022, O'Riordan joined Scottish Championship side Raith Rovers on loan until January 2023, making his debut the following day in a 1–0 defeat to Dundee.

In his third game following his January 2023 return to Crewe, O'Riordan scored his first professional goal, in a 1–1 League Two draw with Stockport County on 31 January. On 25 February 2023, he received his first career red card, being sent off after a second caution in the 87th minute of Crewe's 1–1 draw with Rochdale. After suspension, he scored his second Crewe goal in his next game, a 4-3 win over Salford City at Gresty Road on 10 March 2023.

International career
O'Riordan was capped at under-20 level for the Republic of Ireland in March 2022. His first call up for the Republic of Ireland U21 team came in March 2023, for a friendly against Iceland U21.

Career statistics

References

2003 births
Living people
Republic of Ireland association footballers
Association football defenders
Crewe Alexandra F.C. players
English Football League players
Kidsgrove Athletic F.C. players
Nantwich Town F.C. players
Northern Premier League players
Raith Rovers F.C. players
Scottish Professional Football League players
Sportspeople from Crewe
Republic of Ireland youth international footballers